Japan Time (previously titled JP Time TV when aired on ATV) is a Hong Kong television travel programme which started airing on 2 October 2005. The show focuses on introducing various Japanese tourist attractions to the audience and it is presented by Jam Yau and Rie.

Broadcast
The programme was first shown on ATV World on 2 October 2005.

In 2016, it moved to ViuTV after Asia Television ceased broadcast due to nonrenewal of television licence. Since then, the show added Cantonese dubbing.

References 

2000s travel television series
ViuTV original programming
2000s Hong Kong television series
2005 Hong Kong television series debuts
2010s travel television series
2010s Hong Kong television series